Romualdas "Romas" Petrukanecas (born 16 May 1973) is a Lithuanian sprint canoeist who competed in the early to mid-2000s. He won a bronze medal in the K-1 200 m event at the 2002 ICF Canoe Sprint World Championships in Seville. 
Romas Petrukanecas also win overall World Cup in 2002. And bronze  medal in the K-1 200 m events at the 2002 Europeans Championship in Seget (Hungary)

Petrukanecas also competed in the K-1 1000 m event at the 2004 Summer Olympics in Athens, but was eliminated in the semifinals.

He is currently the Head coach of the Lithuanian kayak team.

Coaching career:

2006 European Championship, Račice (Czech republic), K-2 200 m A. Duonela - E. Balciunas - silver medal;
2006 World Championship, Szeged (Hungary), K-1 200 m A. Duonela - 7th, K-2 500 m A. Duonela - E. Balciunas - 9th;
2007 European Championship, Pontevedra (Spain), K-2 200 m A. Duonela -E. Balciunas -5th, K-2 500 m A. Duonela -E. Balciunas - 6th;
2007 World Championship, Duisburg (Germany), K-2 500 m A. Duonela -  E. Balciunas - 4th;
2008 European U23 Championship, Szeget (Hungary), K-1 500 m R. Malinauskas - bronze medal;
2012 European Championship, Zagreb (Croatia) K-2 200 m E. Balciunas - I. Navakauskas - 4th; K-1 200 m I. Navakauskas - 6th;
2012 Olympic Games, London (Great Britain) K-1 200 m E. Balciunas - 10th;
2013 World Universiade, Kazan (Russia), K-1 200 m I.Navakauskas - gold medal;
2013 World Championship, Duisburg (Germany) K-1 200 m I. Navakauskas - 5th;
2014 European Championship, Branderburg (Germany) K-2 200 m A.Lankas - E. Ramanauskas - silver medal; K-1 200 m I. Navakauskas - 7th;
2014 World Championship, Moscow (Russia) K-2 200 m A.Lankas - E. Ramanauskas - 5th; K-1 200 m I. Navakauskas - 5th;
2015 European Championship , Račice (Czech republic), K-2 200 m A.Lankas - E. Ramanauskas - bronze medal; K-1 200 m I. Navakauskas - bronze medal;
2015 I European Games, Baku  (Azerbaijan), K-1 200 I. Navakauskas - 5th;
2015 World Championship, Milano (Italy), K-2 200 m A.Lankas - E. Ramanauskas - 6th; K-1 200 m I. Navakauskas - 4th;
2016 European Championship, Moscow (Russia), K-1 200 m I. Navakauskas - A. Rumjancevs (Latvia) bronze medals, K-2 200 m A. Lankas - E. Ramanauskas - 9th;
2016 Summer Olympics, Rio de Janeiro (Brazil),K-2 200 m A.Lankas - E. Ramanauskas - bronze medal; K-1 200 m I. Navakauskas - 9th;
2017 World U23 Championship, Pitesti (Romania), K-1 200 m A. Seja - silver medal;
2017 European Championship, Plovdiv (Bulgaria), K-1 200 m A. Seja - 6th;
2017 World Championship, Račice (Czech republic), K-2 200 m A. Lankas - E. Ramanauskas - 9th; K-4 500 m A. Lankas - M. Maldonis - E. Ramanauskas - S. Maldonis - 9th;
2018 European Championship, Belgrade (Serbia), K-1 200 m A. Seja - silver medal;
2018 European U23 Championship, Auronzo di Cadore (Italy), K-1 200 m A. Seja - silver medal;
2018 World U23 Championship, Plovdiv (Bulgaria), K-1 200 m A. Seja - gold medal;
2018 World Championship, Montemor - O - Velho (Portugal). K-2 200 m E. Ramanauskas - I. Navakauskas - 6th;
2018 World Championship, Montemor - O - Velho (Portugal), K-1 200 m A. Seja - silver medal;
2019 II European Games, Minsk (Belarus), K-1 200 m A. Seja - 5th;
2019 World Championship, Szeged (Hungary), K-1 200 m A. Seja - 8th;
2021 European Championship, Poznan (Poland), K-2 200 m A. Seja  - I. Navakauskas - silver medal;
2021 European Championship, Poznan (Poland), K-4 500 m A. Lankas - E. Ramanauskas - I. Navakauskas - S. Maldonis - 7th;
2021 European Championship, Poznan (Poland), K-2 500 m S. Maldonis - M. Maldonis - 8th;
2021 Olympic Games, Tokyo (Japan), K-1 200 m M. Maldonis - 10th;
2021 World Championship, Copenhagen (Denmark), K-1 200 A. Seja - 8th;
2021 World Championship, Copenhagen (Denmark), K-4 500 S. Maldonis, M. Maldonis, I. Navakauskas, A.Seja - 5th;
2022 World Championship, Halifax (Canada), K-2 500 M. Maldonis (with A. Olijnik) - silver medal;
2022 European Championship, Munich (Germany), K-2 500 M. Maldonis (with A. Olijnik) - bronze medal; K-2 200 A. Seja - I. Navakauskas - bronze medal; K-4 500 S. Maldonis - M. Maldonis - I. Navakauskas - A. Seja - 6 th;

References

Sports-reference.com profile

1973 births
Canoeists at the 2004 Summer Olympics
Lithuanian male canoeists
Living people
Olympic canoeists of Lithuania
ICF Canoe Sprint World Championships medalists in kayak